Coboy Junior were an Indonesian pop boy band established on 23 July 2011. This band consists of four members: Aldi, Babas, Rizky, and Iqbaal. Their fans are known by the nickname Comate (Coboy Junior Mate).

In February 2014 Bastian left Coboy Junior, and the band was renamed CJR. The band disbanded on 2 December 2017, and reborn on 5 September 2022 with the band name TBA which is taken from the names of the three returning vocalists, namely Teuku (Kiki), Bastian (Babas), Alvaro (Aldi).

History
Coboy Junior was established on 23 July 2011, when manager Patrick Effendy called Aldi, Bastian, Iqbaal, and Rizky together for private auditions. The boys had previously performed together in Laskar Pelangi: The Musical and the film Lima Elang; they had also all performed well in singing competitions. Effendy, meanwhile, had previously established a group of child singers which performed under the name Superkids. The band emerged during a period in which new bands of young singers (both boys and girls) were becoming increasingly common; other groups established around this time include Lollipop, Superseven and Swittin. Coboy Junior's initial target audience was preteens, aged 10 to 13. However, Effendy changed their focus, aiming at a wider audience – including adults. The band, aside from their vocals, emphasises costumes and choreography.

Their songs often deal with themes of love. The band is sometimes criticised by adults for this, as the adults feel that they are too young to understand or sing of romantic love. In response, Rizky says that it is normal for 12- to 13-year-old boys to like girls, and that there is no issue so long as the band does not go too deep into the dynamics of love. Effendy, likewise, says that parents have to realise that preteens are already beginning to have romantic feelings towards one another. He also notes business considerations behind the focus on love: as Indonesian children tend to listen to songs meant for adults, they are more accustomed to lyrics about love and thus more interested.

By January 2013 Coboy Junior's single "Eeaa", about puppy love, had made the band nationally popular. They had released three other singles by that time: "Kamu" ("You"), "Kenapa Mengapa" ("Why oh Why"), and "Terhebat" ("The Best"). Bastian, in an interview, suggested that at least 70 percent of Indonesians had heard of them by this time. The band's management utilised this popularity to gather new chances at promotion. For instance, in January 2013 the band made an appearance in the soap opera Hanya Kamu #2 (Only You #2).

The band was scheduled to begin a national tour, styled the CJR Generation Tour 2013, from April to December 2013. They were to play in 30 Indonesian cities, ranging from Sabang in western Indonesia to Merauke in the east. Owing to the members still studying in regular junior high schools, the band was only allowed to tour on weekends; weekdays were dedicated to schooling, although practice sessions could still be held.

On 5 June 2013 the band released a movie, titled Coboy Junior: The Movie. In two days the film, directed by Anggy Umbara and costarring Astri Nurdin, Fay Nabila, Abimana Aryasatya, Nirina Zubir, and Dewi Sandra, was seen by over 150,000 people. The film followed the bandmembers as they underwent personal development and attempted to win a mixed singing and dancing competition.

Bastian left Coboy Junior in February 2014. Afterwards, the group was renamed CJR - an abbreviation which was already in popular usage to refer to the band.The band disbanded on 2 December 2017.

Members
Coboy Junior consists of four boys:Alvaro Maldini Siregar (Aldi), Bastian Bintang Simbolon (Bastian), Iqbaal Dhiafakhri Ramadhan (Iqbaal), and Teuku Rizky Muhammad (Rizky), whose ages as of March 2013 were 14, 14, 14 and 16 respectively. The band is managed by Patrick Effendy. Bastian left the group in February 2014.

Timeline

2011–2017(CJR)

2022–(TBA)
Bastian Bintan Simbolon/Babas
Alvaro Maldini Siregar/Aldi
Teuku Rizky Muhammad/Kiki

Single
 Kamu (2011)
 Eeaaa (2012)
 Kenapa Mengapa (2012)
 Terhebat (2012)
 Jendral Kancil (2012)
 Terus Berlari (2013)
 Tetap Percaya (2013)
 Ngaca Dulu Deh (2013)
 Pelangi dan Mimpi (2013)
 Life is Bubble Gum (2014)
 Juara Dunia (20
 Lebih Baik (2015)
 Happy to Me Be (2015)
 Cuma Kamu (2015)
 Tertipu Baikmu (2015)
 Lagi Lagi Lagi (2015)
 Arti Kata ft. Project Pop (2015)
 Tante Linda (2015)
 Pasti Bisa (2015)
 Cantikgenic (2015)
 Teman Saja (2015)
 Damai (2015)
 #eeeaa ft. Endank Soekamti & Yacko (2015)

Discography
 CJR (2013)
 Lebih Baik (2015)

Filmography

Film
 Jendral Kancil (2012)
 Jakarta Hati (2013)
 Petualangan Singa Pemberani 2 (2013)
 Coboy Junior The Movie (2013)
 Comic 8 (2014)
 CJR The Movie: Lawan Rasa Takutmu (2015)
 Ada Cinta Di SMA (2016)

Television
 Coboy Junior: Hanya Kamu (2012)
 Coboy Junior: Hanya Kamu#eeeaa 2 (2013)
 Coboy Junior: Disakiti Oleh Babas

References

Works cited

 

 

Indonesian boy bands
Indonesian pop music groups
Musical groups from Jakarta
Musical groups established in 2011
Anugerah Musik Indonesia winners
2011 establishments in Indonesia